The following elections occurred in the year 1895.

 1895 Liberian general election
 1895 Peruvian presidential election
 1895 Philippine municipal elections

North America

Canada
 1895 Edmonton municipal election
 1895 New Brunswick general election

United States
 1895 New York state election

Asia
 1895 Philippine municipal elections

Europe
 1895 Dalmatian parliamentary election
 1895 Danish Folketing election
 1895 Portuguese legislative election

United Kingdom
 1895 United Kingdom general election

Oceania

New Zealand
 1895 City of Auckland by-election

See also
 :Category:1895 elections

1895
Elections